Glue, or Glue - Historia adolescente en medio de la nada, is a 2006 Argentine film written and directed by Argentine film director Alexis Dos Santos and was his debut long feature film.

Plot 
The movie is set in a small Argentine town in Zapala, Neuquén Province, Patagonia. Lucas (Nahuel Pérez Biscayart), a 16-year-old boy full of testosterone, plays in a punk rock band with his friend Nacho (Nahuel Viale). When he meets a girl, Andrea (Inés Efron), the three mutually engage in drug use and sexual exploration.

Awards
2006: Won MovieZone Award at the Rotterdam International Film Festival (IFFR)
2006: Won Best Local Film at Buenos Aires International Festival of Independent Cinema
2006: Won Young Audience Award at Nantes Three Continents Festival
2006: Nominated for Golden Montgolfiere at the Nantes Three Continents Festival
2007: Won Best First Feature - World Cinema at the San Francisco International Lesbian & Gay Film Festival

References

External links 
 

2006 films
Films set in Argentina
2000s Spanish-language films
Argentine LGBT-related films
Male bisexuality in film
British LGBT-related films
Punk films
Films about drugs
2000s British films
2000s Argentine films